The 1997 NCAA Division I-A football season, play of college football in the United States organized by the National Collegiate Athletic Association at the Division I-A level, began in late summer 1997 and culminated with the major bowl games in early January 1998.  The national championship was split for the third time in the 1990s.  The Michigan Wolverines finished the season atop the AP Poll after completing a 12–0 campaign with a Big Ten Conference championship and a victory in the Rose Bowl over Washington State.  The Nebraska Cornhuskers garnered the top ranking in the Coaches' Poll with a 13–0 record, a Big 12 Conference championship, and a win over Tennessee in the Orange Bowl.  Michigan's Charles Woodson, who played primarily at cornerback, but also saw time on offense as a wide receiver and on special teams as a punt returner, won the Heisman Trophy, becoming the first primarily defensive player to win the award.  The 1997 season was the third and final season in which the major bowl games were organized under the Bowl Alliance system.  The Bowl Championship Series was instituted the following year.

In Tom Osborne's last season as head coach,  Nebraska took over the No. 1 ranking in the nation after defeating Texas Tech midway through the season. Three weeks later, Nebraska slipped to a No. 3 ranking in both polls, as voters weren't impressed by the way the Cornhuskers won their game against an unranked Missouri team (a controversial kicked ball was caught for the game-tying TD as time expired in regulation, leading to a 45-38 overtime win). Michigan moved to No. 1 in the AP Poll after its 34–8 victory over previously No. 2 ranked Penn State, while the Coaches Poll selected Florida State as No. 1 due to their 20-3 win over previously No. 5 North Carolina.

Florida State went into their final regular season game undefeated and still ranked No. 1 in the Coaches Poll. However, Fred Taylor of Florida would run for 162 yards and four touchdowns on the nation's top-ranked run defense, one of those touchdowns being the winning score with less than two minutes to play. This game is commonly referred to as "The Greatest Game Ever Played in the Swamp".

Thus, the consensus No. 1 team going into the bowl season was undefeated Michigan, now ranked No. 1 in both polls. Led by coach of the year Lloyd Carr and Heisman Trophy winner Charles Woodson, Michigan went into the 1998 Rose Bowl against No. 8 Washington State. Michigan defeated Washington State 21–16.

Meanwhile, undefeated No. 2 Nebraska squared off in the 1998 Orange Bowl versus the No. 3 ranked Tennessee Volunteers. The Cornhuskers made a point of smacking down Tennessee as they defeated the Volunteers 42–17. Unusually for the low-key Osborne and his straight-ahead team, after the game he campaigned openly for Nebraska to be named the consensus national champion (Grant Wistrom stated that if "they wanted to give it to Michigan because they haven't won one in 50 years, we don't want it anyway.").

After the bowl games, the AP poll awarded the national championship to Michigan, and the Coaches Poll awarded the national championship to Nebraska, giving Osborne his third national title in four seasons to cap his career. This also marked the last time that a Big 10 (or Pac-10) team would be bound to play in the Rose Bowl instead of heading to a No. 1-No. 2 title game, due to the 1998 BCS realignment.

The Humanitarian Bowl, now known as the Famous Idaho Potato Bowl, began play in Boise, Idaho to help publicise the dwindling Big West Conference and Boise State. The Broncos with their blue turf had just made the jump to Division I-A a year earlier. The Big West champion had formerly gone to the Las Vegas Bowl, but the now only 6 team conference wasn't much of a seat filler.

The Motor City Bowl, now the Little Caesars Pizza Bowl, began play in Detroit hosted by a MAC team.

The Copper Bowl gained corporate sponsorship and was now known as the Insight.com Bowl; it is now known as the Cactus Bowl.

The MAC also grew to a 12-team, two-division conference with a championship game after the return of two former MAC members—Northern Illinois, returning from the independent ranks, and Marshall, moving up from Division I-AA. Marshall's addition increased the number of teams in Division I-A to 112. In a scenario similar to the Big West in 1992, this up-and-comer from I-AA was able to win its division and the inaugural conference championship game in its first year. The Thundering Herd had gone unbeaten and won the I-AA national title the previous season, and had future NFL stars Randy Moss and Chad Pennington.

Rule changes
 Starting with the third overtime period, teams must go for a two-point conversion after a touchdown.
 Strengthened the enforcement of chop blocks.
 Charged teams with a time-out if a player is not wearing their mouth guard.  If a team is out of time-outs when the infraction occurs, a five-yard penalty is assessed.
 Changed the penalty for roughing the punt receiver to 15 yards if he is contacted by a defender within six feet after catching the ball.
 Requiring the game clock be started once the ball is kicked on kickoffs and free kicks after safeties except in the final 2:00 of each half.
 The clock for halftime was to be started immediately following the conclusion of the second quarter. Previously, the clock did not start until all participants had cleared the field and the referee signaled the timekeeper to start the clock. 
 The officials' uniforms now include a letter on the back showing their position ("R" for Referee, "U" for Umpire, "H" for Head Linesman, etc.). The Big Eight Conference was the first to require this in the mid-1980s, followed shortly thereafter by the Southwest Conference and the Pacific-10 Conference. The Atlantic Coast Conference, Big Ten Conference and Southeastern Conference did not require this until the NCAA made it mandatory.

Conference and program changes
One team upgraded from Division I-AA prior to the season. As such, the total number of Division I-A schools increased again, from 111 to 112.

The MAC added two new members, independent (and former member) Northern Illinois and Division I-AA power Marshall, to expand to 12 teams. The league subsequently formed two divisions and added a league championship game.
East Carolina joined a conference for the first time since Division I split in 1978, becoming a member of Conference USA.

Regular Season

August-September
The preseason AP Poll listed Penn State as the top team, followed by No. 2 Florida, No. 3 Florida State, No. 4 Washington, and No. 5 Tennessee. Foreshadowing a year with a lack of consensus at the top, the Coaches Poll selected Florida rather than Penn State as their No. 1 club.

August 30: No. 2 Florida defeated Southern Mississippi 21-6 and No. 5 Tennessee won 52-17 over Texas Tech. The other top teams had not begun their schedules, and the next AP Poll featured No. 1 Penn State, No. 2 Florida, No. 3 Tennessee, No. 4 Washington, and No. 5 Florida State.

September 6: No. 1 Penn State defeated rival Pittsburgh 34-17, No. 2 Florida overwhelmed Central Michigan 82-6, No. 3 Tennessee staved off a UCLA comeback for a 30-24 victory, No. 4 Washington won 42-20 at No. 19 Brigham Young, and No. 5 Florida State used a late 97-yard touchdown drive to beat No. 23 USC 14-7. The next AP Poll featured No. 1 Penn State, No. 2 Florida, No. 3 Washington, No. 4 Tennessee, and No. 5 Florida State.

September 13: No. 1 Penn State dominated Temple 52-10. No. 2 Florida was idle. No. 3 Washington continued to move up with a 36-3 defeat of San Diego State, No. 4 Tennessee was also idle, and No. 5 Florida State crushed Maryland 50-7. The next AP Poll featured No. 1 Penn State, No. 2 Washington, No. 3 Florida, No. 4 Tennessee, and No. 5 Florida State.

September 20: No. 1 Penn State won 57-21 at Louisville, but No. 2 Washington fell 27-14 to No. 7 Nebraska. No. 3 Florida and No. 4 Tennessee squared off in Gainesville, where the defending champs prevailed 33-20; Volunteers quarterback Peyton Manning finished his career winless against the Gators in four tries. Peter Warrick had 249 receiving yards as No. 5 Florida State beat No. 16 Clemson 35-28, while conference rival No. 6 North Carolina won 40-14 at Maryland. Florida now took over the No. 1 spot in both polls, and they were followed in the AP rankings by No. 2 Penn State, No. 3 Nebraska, No. 4 Florida State, and No. 5 North Carolina.

September 27: No. 1 Florida won 55-28 at Kentucky. No. 2 Penn State, No. 3 Nebraska, and No. 4 Florida State were all idle, while No. 5 North Carolina defeated Virginia 48-20. The top five remained the same.

October
October 4: All of the highly-ranked teams won easily. No. 1 Florida blew out Arkansas 56-7, No. 2 Penn State was almost as dominant with a 41-6 victory at Illinois, No. 3 Nebraska hosted No. 17 Kansas State for a 56-26 win, No. 4 Florida State shut out rival Miami 47-0, and No. 5 North Carolina beat Texas Christian 31-10 on the road. The top five again remained the same.

October 11: No. 1 Florida was upset 28-21 by No. 14 LSU. No. 2 Penn State returned to the top spot with a 31-27 comeback win over No. 7 Ohio State. No. 3 Nebraska won 49-21 at Baylor, No. 4 Florida State visited Duke for a 51-27 victory, No. 5 North Carolina beat Wake Forest 30-12, and No. 6 Michigan defeated Northwestern 23-6. The next poll featured No. 1 Penn State, No. 2 Nebraska, No. 3 Florida State, No. 4 North Carolina, and No. 5 Michigan.

October 18: After trailing 15-3 in the fourth quarter, No. 1 Penn State scored two late touchdowns to escape mediocre Minnesota by a 16-15 score. No. 2 Nebraska was more impressive in a 29-0 shutout of Texas Tech. No. 3 Florida State also held their opponent scoreless, winning 38-0 over No. 21 Georgia Tech. No. 4 North Carolina won 20-7 at North Carolina State, and No. 5 Michigan made a late comeback of their own in a 28-24 defeat of No. 15 Iowa. Nebraska took over the No. 1 spot in both polls by a very close margin, followed by No. 2 Penn State, No. 3 Florida State, No. 4 North Carolina, and No. 5 Michigan.

October 25: No. 1 Nebraska posted their second straight shutout, 35-0 at Kansas. No. 2 Penn State was idle. No. 3 Florida State won 47-21 at Virginia. No. 4 North Carolina was also idle, while No. 5 Michigan posted a 23-7 defeat of No. 15 Michigan State. With their second straight win over a ranked opponent, the Wolverines moved up in the next poll: No. 1 Nebraska, No. 2 Penn State, No. 3 Florida State, No. 4 Michigan, and No. 5 North Carolina.

November
October 30-November 1: No. 1 Nebraska overwhelmed rival Oklahoma 69-7. No. 2 Penn State had another close call, winning 30-27 at Northwestern. No. 3 Florida State defeated North Carolina State 48-35, No. 4 Michigan beat Minnesota 24-3, and No. 5 North Carolina held off Georgia Tech 16-13. The top five remained the same in the next poll.

November 8: In the “Flea Kicker” game, No. 1 Nebraska trailed Missouri 38-31 with seven seconds left. Cornhuskers quarterback Scott Frost launched a pass which bounced off the receiver’s chest, off a Missouri defender’s foot, off a Nebraska player’s leg, and finally into the arms of Nebraska’s Matt Davison for a game-tying touchdown. The Cornhuskers came away with a 45-38 overtime victory. Meanwhile, No. 2 Penn State fell 34-8 to No. 4 Michigan and No. 3 Florida State won 20-3 at No. 5 North Carolina. No. 7 Ohio State blew out Minnesota 31-3, while No. 8 Tennessee beat No. 24 Southern Mississippi 44-20. After Nebraska’s struggles and Michigan and Florida State’s triumphs, both polls elevated new teams to the top. The AP’s top five were No. 1 Michigan, No. 2 Florida State, No. 3 Nebraska, No. 4 Ohio State, and No. 5 Tennessee, while the Coaches Poll ranked Florida State in the top spot.

November 15: No. 1 Michigan won 26-16 at No. 23 Wisconsin, No. 2 Florida State blew out Wake Forest 58-7 to clinch the outright ACC title, No. 3 Nebraska destroyed Iowa State 77-14 to earn a spot in the Big 12 championship game, No. 4 Ohio State beat Illinois 41-6, and No. 5 Tennessee won 30-22 at Arkansas. The top five remained the same in the next poll.

November 22: No. 1 Michigan faced off against No. 4 Ohio State with the opportunity to clinch the Big Ten title and a Rose Bowl berth. Three times in the past four years, Ohio State had entered their rivalry game undefeated only to be tripped up by the Wolverines. This time Michigan was the one with a perfect record, and they continued their winning streak over the Buckeyes with a 20-14 victory. In another rivalry game, No. 2 Florida State visited No. 10 Florida hoping to conclude an undefeated season of their own. In a back-and-forth contest with seven lead changes, Doug Johnson’s 63-yard pass set up a 1-yard touchdown run by Fred Taylor for a 32-29 Gators victory. No. 3 Nebraska was idle. No. 5 Tennessee won 59-31 at Kentucky to lock up the SEC Eastern Division title. No. 6 Penn State, whose Rose Bowl hopes were dashed by Michigan’s win, beat No. 24 Wisconsin 35-10. Michigan now held the No. 1 spot in both polls, followed by No. 2 Nebraska, No. 3 Tennessee, No. 4 Penn State, and No. 5 Florida State.

November 29: No. 1 Michigan had finished their schedule. No. 2 Nebraska held off a late Colorado comeback for a 27-24 win. No. 3 Tennessee got past Vanderbilt 17-10. No. 4 Penn State lost 49-14 at Michigan State. No. 5 Florida State and No. 6 UCLA had finished their schedules, but both teams moved up in the next poll: No. 1 Michigan, No. 2 Nebraska, No. 3 Tennessee, No. 4 Florida State, and No. 5 UCLA.

December
December 6: No. 2 Nebraska annihilated No. 14 Texas A&M in the Big 12 Championship Game, leading 47-3 in the fourth quarter and coming away with a 54-15 victory to enter bowl season undefeated. No. 3 Tennessee had a much harder time in the SEC Championship Game against No. 11 Auburn, but Peyton Manning threw for 373 yards and four touchdowns, including a 73-yard pass in the fourth quarter which made the difference in the Volunteers’ 30-29 win. With all other teams having finished their schedules, the top five remained the same in the next poll.

For the third time in four years, the Big Ten and Pac-10’s contract with the Rose Bowl prevented the only two undefeated teams in the nation from meeting in a bowl game. Since No. 1 Michigan was obligated to play the Pac-10 champion (No. 8 Washington State) in Pasadena, No. 2 Nebraska’s Orange Bowl opponent would be one-loss No. 3 Tennessee. Among other major bowls, the Sugar would match No. 4 Florida State up against No. 9 Ohio State, the Cotton would feature No. 5 UCLA and No. 20 Texas A&M, and the Fiesta would pit No. 10 Kansas State against the Big East champ, No. 14 Syracuse.

Conference standings

AP Poll progress

+Penn State and Michigan were Big Ten teams, and Washington was a Pac-10 team.  The Big Ten and Pac-10 conferences played in the Rose Bowl rather than the Bowl Alliance championship game.

Bowl games

Final AP Poll

 Michigan
 Nebraska
 Florida State
 Florida
 UCLA
 North Carolina
 Tennessee
 Kansas St.
 Washington St.
 Georgia
 Auburn
 Ohio St.
 LSU
 Arizona St.
 Purdue
 Penn St.
 Colorado St.
 Washington
 So. Mississippi
 Texas A&M
 Syracuse
 Mississippi
 Missouri
 Oklahoma St.
 Georgia Tech

Others receiving votes: 26. Arizona; 27. Oregon; 28. Air Force; 29. Marshall; 30. Virginia; 31. Clemson; 32. Louisiana Tech; 33. Mississippi St.; 34. Michigan St.; 35. Wisconsin; 36. New Mexico ; 37. Cincinnati; 38. Notre Dame; 39. Iowa; 40. Virginia Tech.

Final Coaches Poll

 Nebraska
 Michigan
 Florida State
 North Carolina
 UCLA
 Florida
 Kansas St.
 Tennessee
 Washington St.
 Georgia
 Auburn
 Ohio St.
 Louisiana St.
 Arizona St.
 Purdue
 Colorado St.
 Penn St.
 Washington
 Southern Mississippi
 Syracuse
 Texas A&M
 Mississippi
 Missouri
 Oklahoma St.
 Air Force
Others receiving votes: 26. Clemson (58); 27. Georgia Tech (55); 28. Iowa (32); 29. Louisiana Tech (31); 30. Oregon (25); 31. Cincinnati (24); 32. Arizona (23); 33. Mississippi St. (20); 34. Michigan St. (16); 35. New Mexico and Wisconsin (13); 37. Tulane (10); 38. Virginia (9); 39. West Virginia (7); 40. Marshall (4); 41. Notre Dame (1).

Awards

Heisman Trophy
Charles Woodson of Michigan won the Heisman Trophy, awarded to the "most outstanding player in collegiate football."

Voting

Other major awards
Maxwell Award (College Player of the Year) – Peyton Manning, Tennessee
Walter Camp Award (Back) – Charles Woodson, Michigan
Davey O'Brien Award (Quarterback) – Peyton Manning, Tennessee
Johnny Unitas Golden Arm Award (Senior Quarterback) – Peyton Manning, Tennessee
Doak Walker Award (Running Back) – Ricky Williams, Texas
Fred Biletnikoff Award (Wide Receiver) – Randy Moss, Marshall
Bronko Nagurski Trophy (Defensive Player) – Charles Woodson, Michigan
Dick Butkus Award (Linebacker) – Andy Katzenmoyer, Ohio St.
Lombardi Award (Lineman or Linebacker) – Grant Wistrom, Nebraska
Outland Trophy (Interior Lineman) – Aaron Taylor, Nebraska
Jim Thorpe Award (Defensive Back) – Charles Woodson, Michigan
Lou Groza Award (Placekicker) – Martin Gramatica, Kansas State
Paul "Bear" Bryant Award – Lloyd Carr, Michigan
Football Writers Association of America Coach of the Year Award: Mike Price, Washington St.

References